Steve Deacon (born 23 November 1967) is an Australian former professional rugby league footballer who played in the 1980s, and 1990s.

Playing career
Deacon was graded by the Eastern Suburbs Roosters in 1987. He played in the Roosters' 1988 Presidents Cup grand final loss to the Parramatta Eels. He made his first grade debut from the bench against the Canberra Raiders at Seiffert Oval in round 18 of the 1989 season. Deacon made his first appearance at centre in his sides' 42-12 loss against the Parramatta Eels in round 14 of the 1990 season.

Deacon would make regular appearances for the Roosters in the 1990 and 1991 seasons. In the 1992 season, the Roosters dominated the early part of the season winning all of their first five games, Deacon was a key ingredient to his side's early season success, but injuries to key players including Deacon himself would see the Roosters' finals hopes slip and eventually they ended up missing out on finals. Injuries would limit Deacon's first grade appearances to just six games in the 1992 season. Deacon's stint with the Roosters ended at the conclusion of the 1993 season.

In 1995, Deacon joined the Gold Coast Seagulls. He retired at the end of the 1995 season. His last game was against the Canberra Raiders at Bruce Stadium in which his side lost 56-6. In total Deacon played 49 games, and scored 8 tries, and kicked 6 goals.

References

1967 births
Australian rugby league players
Gold Coast Chargers players
Living people
Rugby league centres
Rugby league players from Sydney
Rugby league wingers
Sportsmen from New South Wales
Sydney Roosters players